Nainativu Nagapooshani Amman Temple [ - Meaning: Nainativu (island/city of the temple); Nagapooshani (The Goddess who wears snakes as jewellery); Amman (Goddess)] is an ancient and historic Hindu temple located amidst the Palk Strait on the island of Nainativu, Sri Lanka. It is dedicated to Parvati who is known as Nagapooshani or Bhuvaneswari and her consort, Shiva who is named here as Nayinaar. The temple's fame is accredited to Adi Shankaracharya, a 9th-century Hindu philosopher, for identifying it as one of the prominent 64 Shakti Peethams in Shakti Peetha Stotram and its mention in the Brahmanda Purana. The temple complex houses four gopurams (gateway towers) ranging from 20–25 feet in height, to the tallest being the eastern Raja Raja Gopuram soaring at 108 feet high. The temple is a significant symbol for the Tamil people, and has been mentioned since antiquity in Tamil literature, such as Manimekalai and Kundalakesi. The present structure was built during 1720 to 1790 after the ancient structure was destroyed by the Portuguese in 1620. The temple attracts around 1000 visitors a day, and approximately 5000 visitors during festivals. The annual 16-day Mahostavam (Thiruvizha) festival celebrated during the Tamil month of Aani (June/July) - attracts over 100,000 pilgrims. There is an estimated 10,000 sculptures in this newly renovated temple.

This temple is also called by this names by many devotees:

நயினை ஸ்ரீ நாகபூசணி அம்பாள் கோயில் - Nayinai Sri Nagapooshani Ambaal Temple

Nayinai is the meaning of Nainativu in short or also the Shiva name, Nayinaar

நயினை (romanized: Nayinai) is written "Nainai" or "Nayinai" in English language. Both versions are correct, but "Nayinai" is more correct as it is representing the ய் sound in Tamil (equivalent to y).

Mythology

Legend
The Nagapooshani Amman Temple is believed to be originally established by the god Indra while seeking alleviation from the curse of the sage Gautama. Indra seduced Ahalya, Gautama's wife in the guise of the sage. The sage cursed Indra to bear a thousand vulva marks on his body. Unable to face the humiliation, he went into exile to the island of Nainativu. There, he is believed to have created, consecrated and worshipped the moolasthana murti of the goddess Bhuvaneswari, to atone for his sins. The pleased goddess transformed the marks on his body into eyes. She then took on the name of "Indrakshi" (Indra Eyed).

Another legend states that, many centuries later, a cobra (Naga) was swimming across the sea towards Nainativu from the nearby island of Puliyantivu with a lotus flower in its mouth, for the worship of Bhuvaneswari. An eagle (Garuda) spotted the cobra and attempted to attack it and kill it. Fearing harm from the eagle, the cobra wound itself around a rock (referred to in Tamil as; Paambu Sutriya Kal "the Rock around which the Snake wound itself") in the sea about half a kilometer from the Nainativu coast, and the eagle stood on another rock (Garudan Kal "the Rock of the Eagle") some distance away. The merchant Maanikan from the Chola kingdom - a devotee of Bhuvaneswari - was sailing across the Palk Strait to trade with the ancient Naka Nadu noticed the eagle and the cobra perched upon the rocks. He pleaded with the eagle to let the cobra go on its way without any harm. The eagle agreed with one condition that the merchant should construct a beautiful temple for Bhuvaneswari on the island of Nainativu and that he shall propagate her worship in the form of Nagapooshani Amman. He agreed and built a beautiful temple accordingly. The eagle took three dips into the ocean to atone for its sins against the Nagas and hence, the Garuda and Naga resolved their longstanding feuds.

Shakti Peetha

Sati married the god Shiva against the wishes of his father Daksha. Daksha organized a grand yajna (sacrifice), however did not invite Sati and Shiva. However, though dissuaded by Shiva, Sati went to Daksha's yajna uninvited. Daksha insulted Shiva and argued with Shiva. Unable to bear the insults, Sati self-immolated herself.

Shiva was enraged and created Virabhadra and Bhadrakali, two ferocious beings who wreaked havoc at the site of the sacrifice. The Nainai Virabhadra Temple and Nainai Kali Amman Temple  are built in their honour. Virabhadra slew Daksha.

According to some traditions, an angry Shiva performed the fearsome and awe-inspiring Tandava dance with Sati's charred body on his shoulders. During this dance, her body came apart and the pieces fell at different places on earth. According to another version, Shiva placed Sati's body on his shoulder and ran about the world, crazed with grief. Vishnu, used his Sudarshana Chakra to dismember Sati's corpse, following which Shiva regained his equanimity. Both versions state that Sati's body was dismembered into 64 pieces which fell on earth at various places. These 64 holy places, known as Shakti Pithas, have temples of various forms of the Goddess and have become major centers of the Goddess-oriented Shakta sect.

Nainativu Nagapooshani Amman Temple is believed to be where the silambu (anklets) of Sati had fallen. Anklets have been given immense importance in the worship of Shakti since time and memorial. This ornament is also referred to in the famous Tamil epic Silapathikaram - where the story begins and ends with an anklet.

Architecture

Deities
The moolasthanam or garbhagriha ("womb chamber", central shrine) of Nagapooshani Amman and her consort Nayinar Swami (Shiva) are in traditional Dravidian Hindu architecture. The inner wall of the temple together with the outer wall of the central shrine create a pradakshina (path) around the garbhagriha. The entrance is extensively decorated with paintings, sculptures and oil lamps. Over the garbhagriha is a 10 feet high vimana (tower). The garbhagriha has two entrances - the main entrance facing East, from which the Moolamurtis (consecrated deities) can be viewed and one facing South, from which the Utsavamurtis (festival deities) can be viewed. A unique feature of this temple is that Nayinar Swami and Nagapooshani Amman are installed together as if they are one; granting darshanam to devotees as Shiva-Shatki (the primeval energies of the cosmos).

The temple also includes the following upadevas (subordinate deities): Ganesha (Ganapathi), Bhuvaneswari, Kartikeya (Subrahmanya) with consorts Valli and Devayani, Navagraha, Surya, Chandra, Bhairava, 63 Nayanars, Nalvars and Chandikeswarari.

Gopurams
Nainativu Nagapooshani Amman Temple has four decorative and colourful gopurams.
The Raja Raja Gopuram is the largest of the three gopurams that adorn this temple. It has over 2000 intricately sculpted and painted figures on all four sides. It has 9 passages and 9 golden kalasas. From a distance it appears to crown the much older East Gopuram, and hence is known as "Raja Raja Gopuram" ("king of kings tower"). It was constructed from 2010 - 2012 with the efforts of artists from Tamil Nadu, India. Mahakumbhabhishekam (great temple revival ceremony) was held in late January 2012. This event was attended by 200,000 devotees from various cities and towns as far as India, Europe, Australia, and North America.

East Gopuram is the oldest of the three gopurams on the modern day structure. It opens facing the rising sun across the sea in the East. It rises to the height of 54 feet from the base. This gopuram originally had the fewest sculptures. During the renovation period, a number of new sculptures were added and painted in brighter colours to match the newly constructed Raja Raja Gopuram. Upon entering this gopuram, one directly faces the Moolamurtis (consecrated deities).

The South Gopuram was built in the early 1970s. It opens facing South.  It rises to the height of 54 feet from the base. During the renovation period, sculptures on this gopuram were also painted in brighter colours to match the newly constructed Raja Raja Gopuram. Upon entering this gopuram, one directly faces the Utsavamurtis (festival deities).

Although this gopuram is in the South-East corner of the temple complex, the South East Gopuram also faces South. Built in December 2011, its primary purpose is to welcome those coming from within the island to worship the Goddess, and visitors from the nearby Naga Vihara (Buddhist Temple). It reaches the height of about 20–25 feet. It is the smallest gopuram and has the fewest sculptures. It was also painted in bright and vibrant colours to match the other gopurams.

Mandapams
The Vasantha mandapam is used for special poojas during festivals and fasting days to house to Utsavamurtis (festival deities). It is grand in manner. It can directly be viewed from outside through a newly constructed archway on the Southern wall of the temple.

The Vahana mandapam houses the various vehicles the Utsavamurtis (processional deities) are seated upon during temple festivals. It is located on the North wall of the temple. It houses nearly 50 different vehicles. The most impressive being Ravana-Kailasa Vahanam. This vehicle depicts the demonized King of Lanka and ardent devotee of Lord Shiva; Ravana lifting Mount Kailasa while peacefully playing a makeshift veena created from one of his heads and arms by plucking the veins and arteries to soothe Lord Rakshaseshwara (who is the Lord of the Rakshas (of which Ravana is one), Sri Kailasa-Naayinaar Swami). It is believed that Ravana resides within this vehicle and hence it always attracts thousands of devotees when in use. It has become an indisputable icon of this temple due to the myths that surround the visit of Ravana to the island to offer poojas to Lord Rakshaseshwara (who is the Lord of the Rakshas, Sri Kailasa-Naayinaar Swami).

The Kalayana mandapam is used for conducting marriage ceremonies. It is located on the Northern premises of the temple property.

The Annapoorneshwari Annadhana mandapam is used for the distribution of free food during festivals and social events. It is located on the Northern premises, nearby the Kalayana Mandapam. Oftentimes this venue is used to serve wedding feasts after wedding ceremonies which are held at the Kalayana Mandapam. It houses Annapoorneshwari Amman, the Hindu Goddess of nourishment, however regular poojas are not offered here.

The Amuthasurabi Annadhana Mandapam is used for the distribution of free food everyday to all those who visit the temple. It is managed and funded by the Nainativu Sri Nagapooshani Amuthasurabhi Annadhana Society (நயினாதீவு ஸ்ரீ நாகபூசணி அமுதசுரபி அன்னதான சபை - established in 1960). The society is collecting donations from all over the world to serve free food in its mandapam. It is located 2 mins walk from the Southern premises of the temple property. This mandapam serves to validate the values that are mentioned in the ancient Tamil epic of Manimekalai. The epic is set in both the harbour town of Kaveripattinam, the modern town of Puhar in Tamil Nadu, and in Nainativu, a small sandy island of the Jaffna Peninsula. The story follows the following plot: The dancer-courtesan Manimekalai is pursued by the amorous Cholan prince Udyakumaran, but rather wants to dedicate herself to a religious celibate life. The sea goddess Manimekala Theivam (Manimekalai Devi) puts her to sleep and takes her to the island Manipallavam (Nainathivu). After waking up and wandering about the island Manimekalai comes across the Dharma-seat, which was placed there by Lord Indra, on which Buddha had taught and appeased two warring Naga princes. Those who worship it miraculously know their previous life. Manimekalai automatically worshiped it and recollects what has happened in her previous life. She then meets the guardian goddess of the Dharma seat, Deeva-Teelakai (Dvipa Tilaka) who explains her the significance of the Dharma seat and lets her acquire the magic never-failing begging bowl (cornucopia) called Amurta Surabhi ("cow of abundance"), which will always provide food to alleviate hunger. As such, devotees and visitors are welcomed to enjoy a traditional meal after visiting the temple.

The Sri Bhuvaneswari Kalai Aranga Mandapam is used for various performances in dance, music and art. It was recently renovated and repainted in 2011 to suit the design of the newly constructed Raja Raja Gopuram. Common performances in this mandapam include bharatanatyam, mridangam, nadaswaram and sankeerthanam.

Ambala Veedhi
This is the outside of the temple structure and forms the outer pradakshina (path) around the temple.

Nandi, is now universally accepted to be the most common mount of Lord Shiva and the gatekeeper of Shiva and Parvati. This close association of Shiva, Parvati and Nandi explains the presence of a statue of Nandi at the gateway of the temple. This statue is approximately 8 feet high and faces the Moolamurtis directly through the East Gopuram. It is undoubtedly the only large sized Nandi of its kind in Sri Lanka.

The temple administration removed the silver-plated dwajasthambam ("kodi maram"; flag post) in late 2011 to allow for renovations to the temple. It is expected that a new brass-plated dwajasthambam will be installed before June 2012 to replace the one that had been removed. Currently the temple does not have a substitute.

The Nainativu Nagapooshani Amman Temple chariot, is used to carry the Utsavamurtis (processional deities). The chariot is usually used only once a year for the festival Ratholsavam (Tamil: Ther Thiruvizha, "chariot festival"), which is drawn by several thousand devotees around the outer pradakshina (path) of the temple. It reaches the height of 35 feet and is covered with various sculptures depicting the history of the temple. Two other slightly smaller (30 feet) chariots for Ganesha and Kartikeya with consorts - accompany the main chariot. It is one of the largest chariots in Sri Lanka.

The Kailasa-roopa Pushkarini is a temple tank, located on the Southern premises of the temple. It was recently renovated in 2011 and has a 15 feet high sculpture of Sri Nagapooshani Amman embracing Sri Kailasa-Naayinaar Swami atop the famous Ravana-Kailasa Vahanam.  A unique feature about this sculpture is that the cobras with their open hoods, spit water resembling a fountain. Since the renovation, visitors are prohibited from entering its waters.

Another temple tank, Amrutha Gangadharani Theertham is located approximately 1 km from the temple on the western shore of the island of Nainativu. It was built by Muthukumara Swamiyar (a resident saint of Nainativu) in the early 1940s. It is nearby the Nainai Siva-Gangai Temple and is accessed by flights of stone steps leading from the small stone shrine.

Rituals

Worship
There are close to 15 priests in the temple who perform the pooja (rituals) during festivals and on a daily basis.  Like all other Shiva temples of Tamilakam, the priests belong to the Shivaite Adishaivas, a Brahmin sub-caste. The priests live in a closed area North-East of the temple. The temple has a six-time pooja schedule everyday, each comprising four rituals namely abhisheka (sacred bath), alangaram (decoration), naivedyam (food offering) and deepa aradanai (waving of lamps) for both Sri Nagapooshani (Bhuvaneswari) Amman and Sri Nayinaar Swami. The pooja (worship) ceremonies are held amidst music with nadaswaram (pipe instrument) and tavil (percussion instrument), religious instructions in the Vedas by priests and prostration by worshippers in front of the temple mast. The temple street plans form a giant mandala (holy circle pattern) whose sacred properties are believed to be activated during the mass clockwise circumambulations of the central temple.

Festivals
The most important festival associated with the temple is the 16-day-long Mahostavam (Thiruvizha) that is celebrated in annually in the Tamil month of Aani (June/July). During this period, there are a number of events including the Swarna Ratholsavam ("Manja Thiruvizha"; golden chariot festival), Ratholsavam ("Ther Thiruvizha"; chariot festival) and Poongavanam ("Theppa Thiruvizha"; float festival). Major Hindu festivals like Navratri and Shivratri attract thousands of devotees. Like most Shakti temples in Tamilakam, the Fridays during the Tamil months of Aadi (July–August) and Thai (January - February) are given special importance at this temple. Aadi Pooram, the day Parvati is said to have attained puberty, and become a mother to all her devotees is marked in grand manner at this temple.

History

Literary Mentions
Naka Nadu was the name of the whole Jaffna peninsula in some historical documents. There are number of Buddhist myths associated with the interactions of people of this historical place with Buddha. The two Sangam Tamil Buddhist epics; Manimekalai and Kundalakesi describe the islet of Manipallavam of Naka Nadu which is identified with Nainativu islet of the Jaffna peninsula. Manimekalai describes the ancient island of Manipallavam from where merchants came to obtain gems and conch shells. These objects are revered still today by Hindus. Furthermore, Manimekalai directly states that the island is home to Goddess Manimekala Theivam (Manimekalai Devi).

Inscriptions
A 12th century Tamil inscription was found in the temple premises, it contains an edict issued by Parakramabahu I (1153–1186 A.D) addressed to his local Tamil officials in Jaffna, advising them on how to deal with shipwrecked foreign traders.

The people "snake-worshippers" of Nainativu, spoke Tamil based on Ptolemy's description. The interchangeable names Nayar and Naka or Naga, meaning cobra or serpent were applied to and self described by these snake-worshiping people from classical antiquity. The word Naga was sometimes written in early inscriptions as Naya, as in Nayanika - this occurs in the Nanaghat inscription of 150 BCE. Archaeological excavations and studies provide evidence of palaeolithic inhabitation in the Jaffna and Kerala region. The findings include Naga idols and suggest that serpent worship was widely practised in the Kerala and Jaffna region during the megalithic period.  The name Naka as either a corrupted version of the word Nayanar or may have been applied to this community due to their head covering being the shape of a hydra-headed cobra in reverence to their serpentine deities; Sri Naayinar Swami and Sri Nagapooshani Amman. The rulers and society of Nainativu are described as an advanced civilization in the Vallipuram gold plate inscriptions. H. Parker, a British historian and author  of "Ancient Ceylon" considers the Naka to be an offshoot of the Nayars of Kerala Many other archaeological inscriptions refer to the Chola-Naka alliance and intermarriage being the progenitor of the Pallava Dynasty of Tamilakam.

On the right side of the South Gopuram entrance is a large life saver-shaped stone - an ancient anchor. Arab ships used to carry such anchors.

Pilgrimage
The pilgrimage to this temple can be made throughout the year. However, the most popular time to visit the temple is during the 16 day long Mahotsavam (Thiruvizha festival) that is celebrated in annually in the Tamil month of Aani (June/July).

Temple community today and abroad 

Because of the Sri Lankan Civil War many people and devotees of this temple have fled to different parts of the world. Due to the goddesses' honour, devotees around the world have built temples dedicated to Nagapooshani Ambal. Most of the devotees live in Canada (2 temples dedicated), Germany (5 temples dedicated), England (2 temples dedicated), Italy (1 temple dedicated). The goddess is the Kuladeivam (paternal family deity) to approx. 5000 people (in Nainativu and around the world) and the Ishtadeivam (favoured deity) to approx. 25000 people (around the Jaffna Peninsula and around the world).

The temple was a suggestion for the Megabuck Specials 2016 of the famous video game Megapolis. It could be later owned in the Path of Prizes event in year 2020.

See also
Other revered locations of Shakti worship:
Meenakshi Amman Temple - Madurai
Kamakshi Amman Temple - Kanchipuram
Vishalakshi Amman Temple - Kashi
Nagadeepa Purana Viharaya

References 

Hindu temples in Jaffna District
Shakti Peethams